Kentucky Route 307 (KY 307) is a  state highway in the U.S. state of Kentucky. The highway connects mostly rural areas of Fulton, Hickman, and Carlisle counties with Fulton.

Route description

Fulton County
KY 307 begins at the Tennessee state line, at an intersection with KY 129 (State Line Highway) on the South Fulton, Tennessee–Fulton, Kentucky line, within Fulton County, where the roadway continues as Tennessee State Route 43 (Broadway). It travels to the north and curves to the northwest. Immediately, it intersects the eastern terminus of KY 116 (Lake Street). KY 307 turns right onto Lake Street, and travels to the northeast. It travels under a railroad bridge that carries railroad tracks of the Central Illinois Railroad (CIR). It turns left, to the northwest, and crosses over Harris Fork Creek. It curves to the north and has a very brief concurrency with U.S. Route 45 (US 45; Mayfield Road). After they split, KY 307 heads to the north-northeast, traveling along the northeastern edge of Fulton, curves to the north, and has an interchange with the Purchase Parkway [future Interstate 69 (I-69)]. The highway continues to the north and leaves the city and then enters Hickman County.

Hickman County
KY 307 has an intersection with KY 94. At this intersection, it passes Enon Cemetery. The highway curves to the northwest, crosses over some CIR railroad tracks, and curves to the north. It intersects the northern terminus of KY 1698 (Johnson Road). It crosses over Cane Creek and then intersects KY 924 (Kirby Road). The highway crosses over Pond Branch and intersects KY 1529 (Moscow Water Valley Road). At this intersection, it passes Wesley Cemetery. It crosses over Bayou de Chien and Sand Creek. It then has a brief overlap with KY 944 and passes Clark Cemetery. Then, it enters Fulgham, where it intersects KY 58. It continues to the north and intersects the eastern terminus of KY 1708. In Nichols, the highway intersects both the eastern terminus of KY 123 and the northern terminus of KY 3061. After an intersection with the eastern terminus of KY 703, it begins to travel along the eastern edge of the Obion Creek Wildlife Management Area. It crosses over Obion Creek and then leaves the WMA. In Beulah, it intersects the western terminus of KY 1748. It then enters Carlisle County.

Carlisle County
KY 307 curves to the north-northeast and crosses over Little Creek. It then curves back to the north and intersects KY 80. It then intersects the eastern terminus of KY 1173. The highway travels through Kirbyton and intersects the western terminus of KY 548. It then passes Kirbyton Cemetery and intersects KY 408. It intersects KY 121 and then crosses over Lick Creek. The highway intersects the western terminus of KY 849. It curves to the northwest and meets its northern terminus, an intersection with US 62.

Major intersections

See also

References

0307
Transportation in Fulton County, Kentucky
Transportation in Hickman County, Kentucky
Transportation in Carlisle County, Kentucky